Cedar Creek is a  long 3rd order tributary to the Deep River in Chatham County, North Carolina.

Course
Cedar Creek rises about 1 mile east of Goldston, North Carolina and then flows southeast to the Deep River about 0.5 miles east-northeast of Gulf, North Carolina.

Watershed
Cedar Creek drains  of area, receives about 47.5 in/year of precipitation, and has a wetness index of 435.12 and is about 66% forested.

See also
List of rivers of North Carolina

References

Rivers of North Carolina
Rivers of Chatham County, North Carolina